Bičer (Cyrillic: Бичер) is a village in the municipality of Kakanj, Bosnia and Herzegovina.

Demographics

Population Distribution (1991)

In 1991, the local community of Bicer had 1,460 inhabitants, divided as follows :

According to the 2013 census, its population was 288.

References

Populated places in Kakanj